Muzeum Przemysłu w Warszawie was a museum in Warsaw, Poland. It was established in 1982 and closed in 2008.

External links
 

Museums in Warsaw
Museums established in 1982
Defunct museums in Poland
1982 establishments in Poland